The Superintendent of the United States Naval Academy is its commanding officer. The position is a statutory office, and is roughly equivalent to the chancellor or president of an American civilian university. The officer appointed is, by tradition, a graduate of the United States Naval Academy. However, this is not an official requirement for the position. To date, all superintendents have been naval officers. No Marine Corps officer has yet served as superintendent.

The United States Naval Academy is organized much like a civilian college. The Superintendent's principal deputies include overseeing a civilian Academic Dean, who manages the academic program and faculty, and the Commandant of Midshipmen, who serves as dean of students and supervisor of all military and professional training. The Superintendent, Commandant, Academic Dean, and academic division directors sit on the academic board, which sets the academy's academic standards.

Superintendents 

A "—" in the Class year column indicates a Superintendent who is not an alumnus of the academy.

See also

United States Naval Academy Cemetery#Superintendents of USNA
Superintendents of the United States Military Academy
List of Superintendents of the United States Air Force Academy

References
 General

 Inline citations

Bibliography 

 
 
 
 
Super

Super